Real Stories is an Australian satirical television comedy series produced by Carlton Television for Network Ten. It was created by Hamish Blake and Andy Lee. The series was first broadcast on 22 August 2006.

Eight episodes were produced. The program was a parody of current affairs shows. It was hosted by Jennifer Adams, a former Seven Network reporter. The show mimicked a standard current affairs format. Pre-recorded segments in the show were introduced by the host. These segments starred Hamish Blake, Andy Lee, Ryan Shelton, and Tim Bartley with voice-overs provided by Greg Fleet.

The show originally started as a project for Melbourne's Channel 31, a community access television station, as a collaboration between Roving Enterprises and Hamish & Andy's production company, Radio Karate. It was repeated during 2007, and is currently available on DVD. Several podcasts were produced, including material not broadcast in the series.

Setting

Episodes

External links
Real Stories website
Real Stories' Myspace page

Australian comedy television series
Hamish & Andy
Network 10 original programming
2006 Australian television series debuts
2006 Australian television series endings